Platomma luniferum is a species of tephritid or fruit flies in the genus Platomma of the family Tephritidae.

Distribution
Namibia, South Africa.

References

Tephritinae
Insects described in 1861
Diptera of Africa